Rhombodera basalis known as Malaysian shield mantis, is a species of praying mantis of the genus Rhombodera.

Distribution 
R. basalis is found in Malaysia, Indonesia, Thailand, Singapore and Borneo.

Habitat 
R. basalis commonly lives in trees and bushes.

Lifespan 
R. basalis females live up to two years. Males live up to 1.5 years.

See also
List of mantis genera and species

References

External links

Basalis
Mantodea of Asia
Insects of Malaysia
Insects described in 1842